Kesari is a 2018 Nigerian Yoruba-language action film produced by Ibrahim Yekini.  It was directed by Tope Adebayo.

Production 
In an interview, writer and producer Ibrahim Yekini said that the film was inspired by the action scenes he saw in the 2018 superhero film Black Panther.

Cast 

 Femi Adebayo
 Ibrahim Yekini
 Akin  Olaiya
 Kemi Afolabi
 Adebayo Salami
 Muyiwa Ademola
 Toyin Abraham
 Antar Laniyan
 Bimbo Akintola Odunlade

Synopsis 
A tough robber armed with charms meets his match when he meets an efficient policeman.

Awards 
The film won Best Movie and Best Producer of the year in the Yoruba category at the 2019 City People Entertainment Awards.

Sequels 
The film has received three sequels: Kesari 2, Return of Kesari, and Return of Kesari 2. Yekini won Best Actor in a Leading Role (Yoruba) at the 2019 Best of Nollywood Awards for his role in Return of Kesari.

References

External links 
 

2018 action films
Yoruba-language films
Nigerian action films